Masaryk Democratic Academy (MDA) is a think-tank affiliated with the Czech Social Democratic Party (ČSSD). It was founded in 1896 by Josef Steiner and Tomáš Garrigue Masaryk as Masaryk Workers' Academy (MDA). Masaryk Workers' Academy changed its name in 2009.

References

 Czech Social Democratic Party
 Think tanks based in the Czech Republic
1896 establishments in Austria-Hungary